
Gmina Radecznica is a rural gmina (administrative district) in Zamość County, Lublin Voivodeship, in eastern Poland.

Villages
Gmina Radecznica contains the villages and settlements of Czarnystok, Dzielce, Gaj Gruszczański, Gorajec-Stara Wieś, Gorajec-Zagroble, Gorajec-Zagroble-Kolonia, Gorajec-Zastawie, Gruszka Zaporska, Latyczyn, Mokrelipie, Podborcze, Podlesie Duże, Podlesie Małe, Radecznica, Trzęsiny, Wólka Czarnostocka, Zaburze, Zakłodzie and Zaporze.

Neighbouring gminas
Gmina Radecznica is bordered by the gminas of Biłgoraj, Frampol, Goraj, Sułów, Szczebrzeszyn, Tereszpol, Turobin and Zwierzyniec.

References

Polish official population figures 2006

 https://web.archive.org/web/20091018154243/http://radecznicaonline.republika.pl/

Radecznica
Zamość County